Grande Comore is an island in Comoros off the coast of Africa. It is the largest island in the Comoros nation. Most of its population is of the Comorian ethnic group. Its population  is about 316,600. The island's capital is Moroni, which is also the national capital. According to the 2009 revision of the constitution of 2002, it is governed by an elected Governor, as are the other islands, with the federal government being much reduced in power. The name Ngazidja is sometimes seen in the now nonstandard form Njazidja.

History

For several centuries, Grande Comore was divided into a number of sultanates, including Bambao, Itsandra, Mitsamihuli, Mbajini, Hambuu, Washili, Hamahame, Mbwankuu, Mbude and Domba. The sultans were also known as mfaume. In 1886, the ruler of Anjouan, Sultan Said Ali bin Said Omar declared a "state of Ngazidja", usurping the other sultanates and accepting a French protectorate over the island. In 1893, Sultan Said Ali was sent into exile on Réunion. In 1908, France annexed the island and the sultanates were abolished. In 1975, Grande Comore, Anjouan and Mohéli declared independence as the nation of Comoros.

On 23 November 1996 Ethiopian Airlines Flight 961 was hijacked while in Ethiopian airspace en route from Addis Ababa to Nairobi. The Boeing 767-260ER crash-landed in the Indian Ocean near Grande Comore after running out of fuel, killing 125 out of the 175 people on board, including 3 of the hijackers.

In 1997, the Comoros nation began to fall apart as Anjouan and Moheli seceded. Grande Comore became the only island under federal control. By 2002, however, Grande Comore was reunited with the other islands under the new constitution. Abdou Soule Elbak was elected President of Grande Comore in May 2002. He received only 17% of the vote in the first round, coming in first place, and received 60% of the vote in the runoff. He remained in his post until the July 2007 elections, at which point Mohamed Abdoulwahab won the island's presidency.

Transport
Prince Said Ibrahim International Airport serves the island.

References

External links
 Comoros Island election information

 
Comoros archipelago
Autonomous islands of the Comoros